John M. Opitz (born August 15, 1935) is a German-American medical geneticist and professor at the University of Utah School of Medicine. He is best known for rediscovering the concept of the developmental field in humans (first enunciated by Hans Spemann in amphibians) and for his detection and delineation of many genetic syndromes, several now known as the "Opitz syndromes" including Smith–Lemli–Opitz syndrome (SLOS), Opitz–Kaveggia syndrome (FGS1), Opitz G/BBB syndrome, Bohring–Opitz syndrome, and other autosomal and X-linked conditions. He is founder of the Wisconsin Clinical Genetics Center, the American Journal of Medical Genetics, and was a cofounder of the American College and American Board of Medical Genetics.

Early life 
John M. Opitz was born in Hamburg, Germany, on August 15, 1935 to a middle-class family. His father died of tuberculosis while Opitz was still young, a disease which he also contracted and, caused him to spend 14 months in a sanatorium. After seven years of separation, he rejoined his mother in 1947 in Nuremberg where she worked as an interpreter for the US occupation forces during the war-crimes trials. They immigrated to the United States in 1950, eventually settling in Iowa City where Opitz' uncle, Hans Koelbel, was Professor of Cello and Chamber Music at the University of Iowa.

Education 
It was at the age of 15 that his uncle introduced him to Emil Witschi, an internationally acclaimed embryologist, endocrinologist, and zoologist at the University of Iowa, who fanned Opitz' interest in embryology, genetics and evolution. After completing high school, Opitz studied Zoology at the University of Iowa under Witschi's tutelage, receiving his bachelor's degree in 1956. With the approach of Witschi's retirement from the University of Iowa just previous to his graduation, Opitz wondered where he would go next as his previous plan had been to complete a PhD under Witschi. However, with some prodding from his mother, he was reluctantly persuaded to attend medical school at the University of Iowa. His initial lack of interest dissipated as he was immersed in the world of clinical medicine.

He continued his work with Witschi while in medical school, completing a joint review on the biology of sex determination and sex differentiation in animals (Witschi, Opitz, 1961). While attending medical school, Opitz was engaged in a variety of other research projects including: glucose metabolism (with N. Halmi), prostate cancer (R. Flocks), and hereditary hematuria (W.W. McCrory). Others who influenced Opitz while in medical school include Hans Zellweger and Jacqueline A. Noonan. He completed his medical degree in 1959 at the University of Iowa, also a rotating internship and his first year of pediatric residency.

Career

University of Wisconsin 
After completion of residency, Opitz searched for fellowship opportunities. He had followed closely the work of Patau, Inhorn and Smith in Madison on human aneuploidy and so, after application and acceptance, July 1, 1961 saw Opitz at the University of Wisconsin where he completed residency, the last 6 months as pediatric chief resident. He completed his fellowship (1962-1964) in Medical Genetics under Klaus Patau, and David W. Smith. Smith introduced him to the University of Wisconsin Children's Hospital where he began his work on the physical and biological manifestations of syndromes. He also gained experience in the evaluation of normal developmental variability by examining the newborn infants at St. Mary's Hospital in Madison for Smith's study of minor anomalies. It was during the 60's that Opitz set the groundwork on the scientific advances for which he would be best known- the discovery and definition of multiple congenital anomalies syndromes through the recognition of links between pediatric anomalies and heredity.

After completion of his fellowship, Opitz was appointed Assistant Professor of Medical Genetics and Pediatrics at the University of Wisconsin. He spent 18 years at UW-Madison where he was able to establish the Wisconsin Clinical Genetics Center in 1974 as well as a fetal/pediatric pathology and developmental pathology program in association with Dr. Enid Gilbert-Barness.

Shodair- Montana State University 
In 1979, at the invitation of Philip D. Pallister, Opitz left the University of Wisconsin to become the Director of the Shodair-Montana Regional Genetic Service Program in Helena, Montana. This program included such services as cytogenetics and fetal genetic pathology. Later he served as chair of the Department of Medical Genetics at Shodair Children's Hospital and as an adjunct professor in Biology, History and Philosophy, Medicine, and Veterinary Science at Montana State University. In 1994 he was appointed Professor of Medical Humanities.

In Montana, Opitz continued research in genetic syndromes, often collaborating with Phil D. Pallister, leading to the discovery of several syndromes including the Pallister-Hall, KBG, and Pallister-Killian syndromes. This collaboration also led to the discovery of the first human X-autosome translocation which, according to McKusick, was a jumping off point for the era of chromosome mapping.

Prior to leaving Montana, Opitz traveled to Germany to become the first visiting professor of the Hanseatic University Foundation of the University of Lübeck, Department of Genetics.

University of Utah 
In 1997, Opitz joined the faculty at the University of Utah School of Medicine as a Professor of Pediatrics in the division of Medical Genetics and also as a member of the clinical staff at the Children's Medical Center. He holds adjunct appointments in the Departments of Human Genetics, Pathology, and Obstetrics and Gynecology. He was an active participant in the fetal genetic pathology program in the Division of Pediatric Pathology at Primary Children's Medical Center until 2015.

Research 
Opitz' research and interests, in addition to clinical genetics, have covered a wide spectrum of genetic anomalies with focuses on sex determination and sex differentiation, skeletal dysplasias, mental retardation, human malformations and syndromes and the relationship between evolution and development.

"Opitz Syndromes" 
Opitz' work on identifying the physical and biological symptoms of genetic disorders led to the discovery of the "Opitz syndromes" and created an impetus for important basic science advances. These include documentation of the role of cholesterol in vertebrate development after description of the Smith-Lemli-Opitz syndrome or of the role of the MID1 gene in early ontogeny following discovery of the Opitz GBBB syndrome(s).

An abbreviated list of the syndromes to which Dr. Opitz has contributed or for which he was the first descriptor include:
 Bohring–Opitz syndrome
 C syndrome
 Cornelia de Lange syndrome
 KBG syndrome 
 N syndrome
 Noonan syndrome
 Opitz G/BBB syndrome
 Opitz–Kaveggia syndrome (FGS1)
 Smith–Lemli–Opitz syndrome (SLOS)
 Zellweger syndrome

Spemann's developmental field 
In biology, Opitz' most important contribution was the reintroduction of the developmental field concept linking human evolution, genetics, and development. The discovery by Hans Spemann in 1922 of the "organizer" identified the "primary" field. Clinically, radius dysgenesis was defined as a developmental field defect on the basis of causal heterogeneity. Developmental fields are now known as the basic morphogenetic units of the vertebrate embryo. From a phylogenetic perspective, field theory was expanded in recent years to "modularity".

Editorial and published works 
In 1976, Opitz founded and became Editor-in-Chief of the American Journal of Medical Genetics. Opitz retired as editor-in-chief of the AJMG in 2001 and was succeeded by John C. Carey. Opitz still serves as an emeritus editor for the journal.

Opitz has written over 500 papers and textbook chapters and edited 12 books.

Honors, awards and distinctions 
Honorary membership:
 German Pediatric Society- DGKJ(1989)
 Israeli Society of Medical Genetics
 Japan Society of Human Genetics
 Russian Society of Medical Genetics
 Italian Society of Medical Genetics
 South African Society of Human Genetics
 Portuguese Society of Human Genetics (2010)
 Society of Pediatric Pathology (USA)
Honorary degrees (h.c.): 
 1982 – DSci, Montana State University, Bozeman
 1986 – MD, University of Kiel, Germany
 1999 – MD, University of Bologna, Italy
 2004 – MD, University of Copenhagen, Denmark
 2007 – DSci, Ohio State University, Columbus
Awards and Recognition:
 2016 – Order of Merit of the Federal Republic of Germany known as the Bundesverdienstkreuz (BVK) 
 2011 – William Allan Award, ASHG
 2005 – Medal of Honor of the DGfH (German Society of Human Genetics)
 2002 – Establishment of the John M. Opitz Young Investigator Award, John Wiley and Sons-Publisher
 2000 – Distinguished Alumni Award for Achievement, University of Iowa
 2000 – Distinguished Achievement Award for Scientific Literature, IASSIDD
 1996 – Humboldt Prize, Humboldt Foundation of Germany
 1996 – Premio Phoenix Anni Verdi for Genetic Research, Italian Medical Genetics Society
 1996 – Purkynĕ Medal, Czech Society of Medicine 
 1996 – Mendel Medal, Czech Society of Medical Genetics
 1995 – Fellow of the American Association for the Advancement of Science
 1994 – Great Seal, University of Palermo
 1993 – Founding Fellow, American College of Medical Genetics
 1991 – March of Dimes Colonel Harland Sanders Lifetime Achievement Award for Work in the Field of Genetic Science
 1989 – University of Wisconsin Alumni Citation
 1987 – Sidney Farber Lecturer, Society of Pediatric Pathology
 1988 – Pool of Bethesda Award for Research in Mental Retardation, Bethesda Lutheran Home, Wisconsin
 1979 – Corresponding member, DGK- German Society of Pediatrics
 1969-1974 – Research Career Development Award (US PHS/NIH)
 1967 – Fellow American Academy of Pediatrics
 ___ – Member, Brazilian Academy of Sciences
 1985 – Member, German Academy of Sciences Leopoldina
 1982 – Certified Diplomate American Board of Medical Genetics
 1979-1981 –  American Society of Human Genetics Board of Directors

References 

1935 births
Living people
German emigrants to the United States
University of Utah faculty
American geneticists
Medical geneticists
University of Iowa alumni
University of Wisconsin–Madison faculty
Montana State University faculty
Fellows of the American Association for the Advancement of Science
Humboldt Research Award recipients
Recipients of the Order of Merit of the Federal Republic of Germany